Gia Lewis-Smallwood is an American track and field athlete who specialises in the discus throw. She competed at the 2012 Summer Olympics in the discus throw event, finishing 15th in the qualifying round and not advancing to the final.

She holds the American record in an unofficial event: the indoor discus throw at 55.03 m.

International competitions

References

External links

 
 

Living people
1979 births
Track and field athletes from Illinois
People from Champaign, Illinois
American female discus throwers
African-American female track and field athletes
Olympic track and field athletes of the United States
Athletes (track and field) at the 2012 Summer Olympics
Pan American Games track and field athletes for the United States
Pan American Games medalists in athletics (track and field)
Athletes (track and field) at the 2015 Pan American Games
World Athletics Championships athletes for the United States
Pan American Games bronze medalists for the United States
USA Outdoor Track and Field Championships winners
IAAF Continental Cup winners
Medalists at the 2015 Pan American Games
21st-century African-American sportspeople
21st-century African-American women
20th-century African-American sportspeople
20th-century African-American women